Neuhausen may refer to:

Neuhausen am Rheinfall, a town in the canton of Schaffhausen, Switzerland
Neuhausen railway station, a railway station in Switzerland
Neuhausen Rheinfall railway station, a railway station in Switzerland
Neuhausen Badischer Bahnhof, a railway station in Switzerland
Neuhausen auf den Fildern, a municipality in Baden-Württemberg, Germany
Neuhausen (Enz), a municipality in Baden-Württemberg, Germany
Neuhausen ob Eck, a municipality in Baden-Württemberg, Germany
Neuhausen/Spree, a municipality in Brandenburg, Germany
Neuhausen, Saxony, a municipality in the district of Freiberg in Saxony, Germany
Neuhausen, a borough of Worms, Germany
Neuhausen, a city in East Prussia, today Guryevsk, Kaliningrad Oblast
Danish name for the SIG Sauer P210
Vastseliina Castle

See also
 Neuhaus (disambiguation)
 Neuhausen-Nymphenburg, a borough of Munich, Germany